A central city or core city is the largest or most important city or cities of a metropolitan area.

Central city may also refer to:
 A central business district, the commercial and business centre of a city
 In China:
 The urban core of a prefecture-level city (as opposed to the much larger region it governs)
 A national central city, one of a group of cities tasked with leading political, cultural and economic development

Places

United States 
 Central City, Alabama
 Central City, Arkansas
 Central City, Colorado
 Central City, Houston
 Central City, Illinois
 Central City, Iowa
 Central City, Jefferson Territory
 Central City, Kentucky
 Central City, Louisiana, East Baton Rouge Parish
 Central City, Nebraska
 Central City, New Orleans, Louisiana, a neighborhood
 Central City, Ohio
 Central City, Pennsylvania
 Central City, Phoenix, urban village
 Central City, Salt Lake City, Utah
 Central City, South Dakota
 Central City, Virginia

Developments
 Central City (Seoul), a bus terminal with hotel and shopping mall in Seoul
 Central City (Surrey), a shopping mall and office tower complex in Surrey, British Columbia, Canada

Fictional places
 Central City (DC Comics), the home of the second version of the superhero the Flash
 Central City, the home of comics character the Spirit
 Central City, the original home base of the Fantastic Four (who now reside in Manhattan)
 Central City, the capital city in Conquest of the Planet of the Apes
 Central City, the capital city in the 1974 Planet of the Apes TV series
 Central City, the capital of Amestris in the manga and anime Fullmetal Alchemist
 Central City, a capital in the Sonic the Hedgehog video game series
 Central City (Tin Man), the capital of the Outer Zone in the 2007 Sci Fi television miniseries Tin Man
 Central City, the home of the human allies of the Autobots in The Transformers
 Central City, the future capital of Earth in 1960s Doctor Who stories

Music
 Central City May Rise Again, an album by The Cape May

Sports
 Central City FC, a soccer club based in Central Melbourne, Australia